Paz Encina (born July 9, 1971) is a Paraguayan director and screenwriter, known for her drama film Hamaca paraguaya (2006), winner of the FIPRESCI Award of the Cannes Film Festival.

Biography
She was born in Asunción, Paraguay. She studied at the Universidad del Cine of Buenos Aires, where she obtained a bachelor's degree in cinematography.

Hamaca paraguaya was her first feature film. She previously made short films like La siesta (1997), Los encantos del Jazmín (1998) and Supe que estabas triste (2000).

Filmography
As director
 Hamaca paraguaya - short film, 2000
 Supe que estabas triste - 2000
 Hamaca paraguaya - feature film, 2006
 EAMI - 2022

As screenwriter
 Hamaca paraguaya - 2000
 Supe que estabas triste - 2000
 Hamaca paraguaya - 2006
 EAMI - 2022

References

External links
 

1971 births
Paraguayan film directors
Paraguayan women film directors
Living people
People from Asunción